Ten Seconds To Hell (released in the UK as The Phoenix) is a 1959 British and West German film directed by Robert Aldrich, based on Lawrence P. Bachmann's novel The Phoenix. The Hammer Films/UFA joint production stars Jack Palance, Jeff Chandler and Martine Carol.

Set in the aftermath of World War II, the film focuses on a half-dozen German POWs who return to a devastated Berlin and find employment as a bomb disposal squad, tasked with clearing the city of unexploded Allied bombs. Their fatalistic duties lead them to form a macabre pact; a tontine into which they donate a part of their individual paychecks into a pool that those still surviving at the end of three months divide the money. Eventually, only two men are left, and they are both in love with the same woman.

Robert Aldrich's direction is noted for its meticulous attention to the techniques of bomb deactivation and disposal.

Plot

In post-war Berlin, British Major Haven (Richard Wattis) recruits members of a returning German bomb disposal unit, Hans Globke (James Goodwin), Peter Tillig (Dave Willock), Wolfgang Sulke (Wesley Addy), Franz Loeffler (Robert Cornthwaite), Karl Wirtz (Chandler) and Eric Koertner (Palance), to defuse unexploded Allied bombs scattered throughout the city.

Delighted by the well-paying position, Karl bets Eric that he will outlive him. Although initially taken aback by the wager, the other men soon agree that half of their salaries will go to the survivors of the dangerous mission in three months' time. The British, in the form of Major Haven (Wattis), provide the men new uniforms and equipment, and assign Frau Bauer (Virginia Baker) as their liaison. Karl volunteers to lead the unit, but the men vote for the reluctant Eric instead.

Later, Karl and Eric move into an Allied-approved boarding house run by pretty young widow Margot Hoefler (Carol), a French woman whose German husband died during the war.

Several weeks go by in which the men successfully and safely defuse numerous bombs; then the men are stunned when young Globke is killed while defusing a British 1000-pound bomb. Suspecting that the bomb has double fuses, Eric asks Haven to request information from British armaments on its design. At the boardinghouse, Karl continually flirts with Margot, to Eric's annoyance. One evening when Margot loudly protests Karl's drunken advances, Eric bursts into Margot's room to help her and Karl retreats, ridiculing Eric for his motives. Deducing that Eric disapproves of her behavior, Margot explains that her uneasy situation as a traitor to the French and an outsider to the Germans has left her jaded and willing to take happiness wherever she can find it. When Eric remains critical, Margot accuses him of denying his own desires.

A few days later, Frau Bauer receives a report that Tillig has been trapped under a live bomb by the partial collapse of a ruined building. With the other men away on assignments, Eric and Karl race to the site, and despite Tillig's protests, inspect the bomb. After Eric defuses the bomb safely, a doctor arrives and upon examining Tillig declares there is no chance for his survival. Refusing to accept the pronouncement, Eric hurries outside to request equipment to lift the bomb, but as Karl expresses his doubts, the building collapses on Tillig and the doctor. Distraught, Eric returns to the boardinghouse where he seeks solace from Margot. The next day, Eric takes Margot to another ruined section of the city and reveals that before the war he was an architect. Eric struggles to conceal his growing feelings for Margot, admitting that he is confused about becoming romantically involved while his life is in danger daily.

Back at headquarters, Haven tells Eric that because of the post-war chaos, they have been unable to gather information on the thousand-pound bombs. When Haven discloses that he knows of Eric's former profession, Karl, unaware that his colleague was an esteemed architect, expresses surprise. Eric tells Haven that he was forced into demolitions when he fell into disfavor for making anti-Nazi political statements. Karl and the other men were all pressed into demolitions as punishment for some indiscretion and all vowed to do everything they could to survive the war. Mocking Eric's growing anxiety, Karl urges him to quit the unit and give up the wager, but Eric refuses.

A month before the wager's deadline, Sulke is killed while defusing a double fused bomb. Eric, Loeffler and the men agree to adhere to the terms of the wager but discuss giving the salaries to Sulke's widow and child. When Eric presents the proposal to Karl, he scoffs at the suggestion, explaining that his motto has always been to look after himself. The next day Loeffler is called to defuse a bomb found in a canal. Later, Eric learns that Loeffler has drowned in the attempt. That afternoon when Margot urges Eric to give up the bet and quit the unit, Eric explains he must know whether he can triumph over Karl's greed and selfishness.

A few days later, Karl is assigned to defuse a thousand-pound bomb and Eric joins him at the site to make an inspection. The men discuss a strategy to avoid the potential second fuse, then Eric departs, but worriedly hovers nearby. After removing the top of the bomb, Karl gently handles the cap then abruptly calls for help, claiming the detonator pin has slipped. Eric rushes in and provides a pencil, which he offers to hold in place of the pin while Karl retrieves his tools from the landing. Moments later, Eric is stunned when the rope Karl used earlier to remove the top pulls tautly across his hand, forcing him to release the pencil. The bomb does not explode, however, and Eric realizes that Karl has tried to kill him. Eric punches Karl in the face. Once Karl gets back on his feet, he says, "Guess it's still my bomb." Eric replies, "Still your bomb." Eric then gets his coat and walks away. Karl resumes defusing the bomb. Once Eric is a safe distance away, the bomb explodes, killing Karl.

The film closes after saluting the efforts of the ordnance removal teams, which have allowed Berlin to rebuild.

Cast
Jack Palance as Erik Koertner
Jeff Chandler as Karl Wirtz
Martine Carol as Margot Hofer
Robert Cornthwaite as Franz Loeffler
Virginia Baker as Frau Bauer
Richard Wattis as Major Haven
Wesley Addy as Wolfgang Sulke
Dave Willock as Peter Tillig
James Goodwin as Hans Globke
Nancy Lee as Ruth Sulke
Charles Nolte as Doctor

Production
Robert Aldrich had just been fired from making The Garment Jungle:
I couldn't get a job. Now that year was over, and I couldn't get a job. It goes back to staying at the table. Anybody that stays away for awhile, voluntarily or involuntarily, risks never coming back. Then somebody brought me The Phoenix. I figured I might as well get out of town, so I rewrote it much to its detriment and went to Germany.
It was only the second film from the newly formed Seven Arts Productions. The original title was The Phoenix and it was also known as 6 to 1 and The ExtraEdge.

Filming took place in Berlin over a ten-week period.

Home media
Ten Seconds to Hell was released to Blu-ray DVD by Kino Lorber (under license from MGM) on February 24, 2015 as a Region 1 disc.

References

External links
 
Review of film at Variety

1959 films
1950s thriller films
British thriller films
English-language German films
Films directed by Robert Aldrich
Films set in 1945
Films based on American novels
Films based on thriller novels
Films set in Berlin
British black-and-white films
Hammer Film Productions films
UFA GmbH films
West German films
1950s English-language films
1950s British films